Domingo Gómez-Acedo y Villanueva (6 June 1898 – 14 September 1980), also known as Txomin Acedo, was a Spanish footballer who played primarily as a left-sided forward and sometimes as a left back. Acedo was in the Spain national team that competed in the 1920 Summer Olympics, and won the silver medal.

Club career
Acedo spent his entire career with Athletic Bilbao, they won four national Copa del Rey competitions, he scoring once in the 1916 Final and twice in the 1921 Final. They also won eight regional North/Biscay Championships in a 14-year spell playing alongside José María Belauste, Sabino Bilbao and Pichichi for club and country. His primary attributes were his great pace and set-piece abilities, including scoring 'Olympic goals' (direct from a corner kick).

He is the youngest player and goalscorer in the history of Athletic, having made his debut – and scored – in the Campeonato Regional Norte on 18 October 1914, at the age of 16 years, four months and 12 days. He had not been registered officially as a player with Athletic for the requisite six months, and the club were sanctioned by the federation. His records have sometimes been overlooked and the feats attributed incorrectly to Agustín Gaínza (and subsequently to Iker Muniain).

Acedo is also the club's youngest player and scorer in the Copa del Rey having found the net on his debut in that competition on 25 April 1915, aged 16 years, 10 months and 19 days (neither Muniain nor Gainza played in the cup before turning 17).

International career
On 28 August 1920, Otero was among national team history as one of the eleven footballers who played in the first game of the Spain national team for the 1920 Summer Olympics, in an eventual 1–0 victory over Denmark. He featured in three more games at the tournament, scoring the winning goal against Sweden and starting in the play-off for the silver medal against the Netherlands, which Spain won 3–1. In total, he earned 11 caps for Spain between 1920 and 1924, scoring 1 goal.

With Athletic playing in the local league, he was summoned to play for the Biscay autonomous football team, and was a member of the team that participated in the 1922–23 Prince of Asturias Cup, an inter-regional competition organized by the RFEF. In the quarter-finals against Asturias on 13 November 1922, Acedo imprinted his name in the competition's history with an late equaliser in extra-time to level the scores at 2–2 and force a second extra period in which Asturas prevailed as 4–3 winners.

International goals
Acedo's team score listed first, column indicates score after his goal.

Spain

Biscay

Personal life
Domingo Acedo's older brother Aquilino also played for Athletic Bilbao just prior to his younger sibling's debut; in his brief career he featured in the 1913 Cup final defeat to Racing Irun, and in the inaugural match at San Mamés stadium against the same opposition (now renamed Real Unión), before retiring through injury.

A sister of the family, María Mercedes Acedo, married the journalist Manuel Aznar Zubigaray. They were the grandparents of José María Aznar, Prime Minister of Spain in the 1990s.

Honours

Club
Athletic Bilbao
 Spanish Cup: 1915, 1916, 1921, 1923; runner-up: 1920.
 North/Biscay Regional Championship (8): 1914–15, 1915–16, 1919–20, 1920–21, 1922–23, 1923–24, 1926–27, 1928–29

International
Spain
Olympic Games Silver medal: 1920

References

External links
 
 
 

1898 births
1980 deaths
Spanish footballers
Footballers from Bilbao
Athletic Bilbao footballers
Spain international footballers
Footballers at the 1920 Summer Olympics
Olympic footballers of Spain
Olympic silver medalists for Spain
Olympic medalists in football
Medalists at the 1920 Summer Olympics
Association football forwards
Basque Country international footballers